Heny Sison, popularly known as Chef Heny, is a pastry chef, cake decorator, and television host in the Philippines.

Early life 
Sison started working as an economic researcher and financial analyst. She enrolled in culinary classes to cultivate her interest in baking and cake decorating. She eventually resigned and started a business making birthday and wedding cakes as well as teaching baking and cake decorating.

Culinary school 
In 1985, Sison opened the Heny Sison School of Cake Decorating and Baking. Later, she renamed it to Heny Sison Culinary School after adding cooking classes to her regular baking repertoire to provide a more comprehensive culinary education. Today, her school holds recreational short courses and months-long culinary programs for serious culinary professionals. She has a pool of full-time and part-time chef-instructors specializing in Philippine, Asian, and European cuisine, among others.

Culinary training 
Sison trained in various elements of cake decorating and baking at the Wilton School of Cake Decorating and Confectionery in Woodridge, Illinois; L'Academie de Cuisine in Bethesda, Maryland; Maid of Scandinavia in Minneapolis under Roland Winbeckler, Marsha Winbeckler and Marie Grainger; the Culinary Institute of America at Greystone, Napa Valley and Draeger's Culinary Center in California.

Media exposure 
Sison hosted a Sunday cooking show entitled A Taste of Life with Heny Sison aired on IBC-13 Television Network. She writes for culinary magazines and newspaper features. She has endorsed dairy products in television and print advertisements. Sison has also appeared either as a judge, commentator, or host in cooking competitions televised nationwide.

Business interests 
Sison is a Director of Petal Craft International, a firm which conducts training in the design of sugar flowers for export and local markets. She is also a Director of Cake Art International, a retailer and wholesaler of confectionery, baking and cake decorating supplies.

Organizational affiliations 
Sison is a member of the International Cake Exploration Society and the Bread Bakers Guild of America.

Client 
Sison is famous for having baked wedding cakes of actresses Mikee Cojuangco-Jaworski and Ruffa Gutierrez-Bektas.

External links 
 Heny Sison Culinary School
 IBC-13 Television Network

Filipino chefs
Filipino television personalities
Living people
Pastry chefs
Year of birth missing (living people)